The Red River flood of 1997 was a major flood that occurred in April and May 1997 along the Red River of the North in Minnesota, North Dakota, and southern Manitoba. It was the most severe flood of the river since 1826. They inundated virtually everything in the twin communities. Total damages for the Red River region were US$3.5 billion. The flood was the result of abundant snowfall and extreme temperatures. 

In Grand Forks, thousands of people, including Air Force personnel from Grand Forks Air Force Base, tried to prepare for the 1997 flood by building sandbag dikes. These dikes were constructed based on a 49-foot estimate of flooding set by the National Weather Service. The river crested at 54 feet in Grand Forks. Grand Forks mayor Pat Owens had to order the evacuation of more than 50,000 people, most of the population of the city, as a huge area was flooded. A large fire started in downtown Grand Forks, engulfing eleven buildings and sixty apartment units before being extinguished. Those affected by the flood in the U.S. received donations from across the nation, along with billions of dollars in federal aid. City officials and flood-forecasters were criticized for the difference in estimates and actual flood levels.

As a result of the 1997 flood and its extensive property losses, the United States and state governments made additional improvements to the flood protection system in North Dakota and Minnesota. A dike system was built on both sides of the river to protect the twin Forks cities. In the aftermath, the Federal Emergency Management Agency (FEMA) worked with the cities of Grand Forks and East Grand Forks to clear residential and business development from a large area of floodplain, because of the certainty of future regional floods, and also as the floodplain is intended to be a natural means to absorb floodwaters. They also redeveloped the floodplain along the river as the Greater Grand Forks Greenway, including several parks, a Minnesota state campground recreation area, and a 20-mile biking and walking trail.

Flooding in Manitoba resulted in over $500 million in damages. The Red River Floodway, an artificial waterway completed in 1968 and nicknamed "Duff's Ditch", exceeded its capacity flow but managed to divert the floodwaters around Winnipeg which minimized damage. From 2005 to 2010, the province made substantial upgrades to inlet control structures and fire protection, increased elevation of existing dikes (including the Brunkild dike), and widened the floodway channel.

Previous floods

The Red River of the North has flooded repeatedly through the centuries. It is highly prone to spring flooding because of its northward flow, the nearly flat former lake bed of the valley, and ice formation on the river. As spring approaches, the snow melts from south to north in the same direction as the riverflow. At times high waters encounter ice on the river and back up, spreading out of the banks. The wide flatness of the terrain, formed from an ancient lake bed, and the low slope of the river also contribute to severe flooding in the region.

Serious floods occurred in 1948 and 1950. The 1950 flood reached a high of 30 ft (9.2 m) at Winnipeg and caused the largest evacuation in Canada's history: an estimated 70,000 to 100,000 people had to be evacuated. An estimated $606 million CAD (1997) of damage resulted. In the aftermath, the government of Manitoba and the Canadian federal government constructed flood safety measures.

The first known records of floods along the Red River were documented in the 1770s. Severe floods have occurred throughout the 19th and 20th centuries, including in 1979. Residents and officials incorrectly assumed that homes that were safe in 1979 would be beyond the reach of a future flood.

Impacts

North Dakota and Minnesota

The Red River forms the border between Minnesota and North Dakota. A few sets of "sister cities" developed along opposite sides of the river. Grand Forks, North Dakota and its counterpart East Grand Forks, Minnesota, were the pair most severely affected by the 1997 flood. Fargo, North Dakota/Moorhead, Minnesota (Fargo-Moorhead) and Wahpeton, North Dakota/Breckenridge, Minnesota also had severe flooding. Much of the flooding accumulated not only because of the rising river levels, but also from overland flooding, as meltwater did not drain away. Temporary dikes were erected along the riverfront and around the edges of towns, but were sometimes overwhelmed.

It was difficult for the cities to prepare for such an enormous flood. The National Weather Service (NWS) had forecast that the river would crest at 49 feet (14.9 m), which was its highest level during the 1979 flood. The cities had built dikes to this level, but the river continued to rise past it. Taken by surprise, the NWS did not upgrade its forecast until April 16, the day the river reached 49 feet.

The dikes in the low-lying Lincoln Drive neighborhood of Grand Forks were the first to break, doing so early on April 18, as the river kept rising. Other dikes in the Grand Forks and East Grand Forks area failed that day and the next, flooding thousands of homes. During this time, Grand Forks mayor Pat Owens ordered the evacuation of more than 50,000 people, much of the population of the city. This was the largest evacuation in the United States since the evacuation of residents in Atlanta, Georgia during the Civil War.

Water reached areas more than two miles (3 km) inland from the Red River, requiring evacuation of all of East Grand Forks and 75% of Grand Forks. School was cancelled in both cities for the remainder of the term, as were classes at the University of North Dakota. All transportation was cut off between the two cities (and for many miles, the two states). East Grand Forks residents were evacuated to nearby Crookston, namely to the University of Minnesota Crookston. Residents of Grand Forks were given mandatory evacuation orders on April 18, and retreated to Grand Forks Air Force Base (residents stayed in airplane hangars, which were supplied with more than 3,000 cots). Many residents also evacuated to motels and homes in outlying communities.

The river crested at 54.35 feet (16.6 m) on April 21, and the river level did not fall below 49 feet (14.9 m) until April 26. Because water drained so slowly out of the most low-lying areas, some homeowners could not visit their damaged properties until May. By May 30, the Red River had receded below flood stages everywhere in North Dakota.

Manitoba

The province of Manitoba completed the Red River Floodway in 1968 after six years of construction, built permanent dikes in eight towns south of Winnipeg, and built clay dikes and diversion dams in the Winnipeg area. Other flood control structures completed later were the Portage Diversion and the Shellmouth Dam on the Assiniboine River. It caused 28,000 people to be evacuated and $500 million CAD in damage to property and infrastructure.

The 1997 flood was a 100-year flood. It came close to overwhelming Winnipeg's existing flood protection system.

Winnipeg Mayor Susan Thompson, announcing that the design limit had been reached, misinterpreted this as good news that the flooding had peaked. City sand-bagging stopped, and national reporters left the city, but the water continued to rise inside and outside of the city until the peak late on May 3 / early on May 4. The city officials have said that the peak occurred on May 1; scientific reports record a peak on May 3/4.

Towns upriver of Winnipeg, forewarned by footage of buildings in Grand Forks burning and covered in meters of water, built ring dikes to protect their homes and properties. The province of Manitoba called in the Canadian Forces, the Royal Canadian Mounted Police, and the provincial Department of Natural Resources. Many people chose to evacuate, including residents from Morris, who had only two days notice to evacuate to Winnipeg. Thousands of volunteers helped to build sandbag dikes around homes and property. It cost $10 million (CAD).

Almost all of the ring dikes around the towns held, except for that at Ste. Agathe. The town's dike system was prepared for the river approaching from the south, but the river had spread widely and floodwaters swamped the town from the west. At the flood's peak in Canada on May 4, the Red River occupied an area of 1,840 km2 (710 mi2) with more than 2,560 km2 (990 mi2) of land underwater, which earned it the nickname "Red Sea."

While the flooding was still underway, the federal Liberal government led by Jean Chrétien called a snap election. Several of the party's MPs from the province, including Reg Alcock, requested a delay until the flooding was under control. When Chrétien let the election go ahead as originally planned, Alcock transformed his campaign office into a volunteer relief centre, spending his time in relief efforts instead of campaigning, and won re-election.

Aftermath
In July, Canadian Prime Minister Jean Chrétien and United States President Bill Clinton appointed the International Red River Basin Task Force, comprising members from both countries. The task force's purpose was to find ways to improve flood forecasting.

The province of Manitoba asked the International Joint Commission (IJC) to provide a report on the flood event and to recommend measures to ensure further flood protection for the city of Winnipeg. Largely as a result of this study, the province widened the floodway between 2004 and 2010.

Societal response 
 Catastroffiti
 Catastroffiti, a form of graffiti related to natural disasters, starts to appear as affected residents gut their houses, placing damaged materials on the berms.  At first, this graffiti was placed on trashed appliances to prevent theft and resale, but soon expanded in medium and purpose.  The graffiti done mostly in spray paint (also mud) started to not only be a precaution, but a dialogue of emotions related to the effects of the flood.  Post-flood emotions driving this largely consisted of frustration with the National Weather Service after it predicted a flood crest about five feet less than the actual.  As this developed, catastroffiti was appearing on not just household appliances, but also houses, garages, and signs.  In the aftermath of the 1997 Red River Flood, catastroffiti became a method of commentary and coping in the affected areas.

See also
1950 Red River flood 
1997 Red River flood in the United States
2009 Red River flood
2011 Red River flood
2022 Red River flood

References

Further reading

External links

Selected Bibliography, Red River of the North Flooding
The Great Flood of 1997—10 Years Later, from Minnesota Public Radio, Retrieved on March 25, 2009
North Dakota State University's Fargo Flood website

Natural disasters in Manitoba
Red River Flood, 1997
Red River Flood, 1997
Red River
Red River Flood, 1997
Red River Flood, 1997
Red River
Red River
Greater Grand Forks
Natural disasters in Minnesota
Natural disasters in North Dakota
History of Winnipeg
Grand Forks, North Dakota
Red River Flood
Red_River_flood, 1997
Red_River_flood, 1997
Red River floods
1997 in North Dakota
1997 in Minnesota